Martin Smith may refer to:

Arts and entertainment
Martin Seymour-Smith (1928–1998), British poet, literary critic, biographer and astrologer
Martin Cruz Smith (born 1942), American writer
Martin Smith (drummer) (1946–1997), British drummer for Gentle Giant and Simon Dupree and the Big Sound
Martin Smith (potter) (born 1950), English potter and professor of ceramics and glass
Martin Smith (entertainer) (1957–1994), British actor, singer and composer
Martin Smith (documentarian) (born 1949), American filmmaker for the series Frontline
Martin Smith (Delirious?) (born 1970), English vocalist, guitarist and songwriter, previously front man of Delirious?
Martin Smith (film maker), Scottish BAFTA winning writer/director of Tracks

Government and politics
Martin Tucker Smith (1803–1880), British banker and Member of Parliament for Wycombe and Midhurst
Martin F. Smith (1891–1954), American politician
Martin T. Smith (1934–2015), American politician and lawyer
Martin Hamilton-Smith (born 1953), South Australian politician
Martin Smith (activist) (born 1963), British political activist

Sports
Martin Smith (swimmer) (born 1958), British swimmer
Martin Smith (footballer, born 1974), British former professional footballer
Martin Smith (snooker player) (born 1961), British snooker player
Martin Smith (footballer, born 1995), British footballer
Martin Smith (figure skater) (born 1968), Canadian ice dancer
Martin D. Smith (born 1978), Danish football defender

Other
Martin Smith (academic), British professor of robotics at Middlesex University, and president of the Cybernetics Society, London, UK
Martin Smith (designer) (born 1949), British automobile designer
Martin Smith (Royal Marines officer) (born 1962), Commandant General Royal Marines
Martin Luther Smith (1819–1866), American soldier and civil engineer
Martin V. Smith (1916–2001), American developer and philanthropist
Martin Ferguson Smith (born 1940), British scholar and writer
Martin Linton Smith (1869–1950), British Anglican bishop

See also
Martin Smyth (born 1931), Northern Ireland unionist politician, MP for Belfast South 1982–2005
Martin Smyth (boxer) (1936–2012), Irish boxer
Martyn Smith (disambiguation)
Marty Smith (1956–2020), American motocross racer